Morgan Spurlock Inside Man is an American documentary series which aired on CNN. Episodes featured Morgan Spurlock investigating a range of topics from an insider's perspective.

Overview
In each one-hour episode, documentary filmmaker Morgan Spurlock investigated topics of national interest using participatory journalism. Topics explored include marijuana, gun control, migrant farm workers, and elder care. In the premiere episode, Spurlock worked at a medical cannabis dispensary in Oakland, California. In a Season 3 episode, Spurlock used only Bitcoin as currency for a week.

Reception
The first season won the IDA Documentary Award for best limited series. The third series won the CINE Golden Eagle Award for Professional Media, Nonfiction Content.

Episode list

Season 1: 2013

Season 2: 2014

Season 3: 2015

Season 4: 2016

References

External links

  at CNN
 

CNN original programming
2010s American documentary television series
2013 American television series debuts
2016 American television series endings